Bryan McCormack (born in Dublin, 15 September 1972), is a Contemporary artist who specifically deals with social subject matters. In the last fifteen years, Bryan Mc Cormack has had over 30 group and solo exhibitions. Currently he lives and works in Paris, France.

Life

After his initial studies, Bryan Mc Cormack left Ireland to travel. Today, based in Paris, he creates and exhibits, primarily, installations in situ and sculptures that are social in their concept.

Work

2003–2004 

In 2003 and 2004, Mc Cormack exhibited at Castagneto Po Arti al Castello Foundation in Turin, Italy : Who Are The Heros (An Installation in situ, examining the devastating effects of military action) and : Unleashing The Design of Imponderable Immortality on the Misguided, Servile Burgeoise (An installation in situ, concerned with the economic divide between the different social classes).

2005 

In 2005, Bryan Mc Cormack exhibited at the Empire Gallery in London, an installation in-situ, titled : Intimate Whisperings While the Words Break Down (A work that investigated mental illness in today's society).

The same year he also exhibited at the Galerie Colbert in Paris the installation insitu : The Diaries of John Doe (3), (Which looked at the causes of loneliness and solitude in contemporary society).

2006 

In 2006, the Christian Colas Gallery in Paris hosted the installation insitu : See Nothing, Hear Nothing, No Nothing. (This work was concerned with people's apathy toward economic and social turmoil when not directly implicated).

2009 

The installation insitu : EarSpiltting Timbre (a work that commented on the destruction and urban violence of car bombs and urban terrorism in today's world) at UNESCO, Paris.

2010 

The monumental public sculpture : When Joris Ivens meets Hraesvelgr (Which is both a reflection on ecological politics in developed society, as well as, a tribute to the film "Le Mistral" (1966) by the Dutch filmmaker Joris Ivens) was permanently installed at the Park St. Cloud in Paris.

2011 

The installation insitu : Preservation is Life The Sounds of my Life, (A work exploringboth the practices of "safesex" whilst also looking at the political ramifications of sexuality today) was installed over the six floors (escalators) of the Centre Pompidou in Paris.

2012 
The installation/performance : Chromo Zone Y (A performance installation questioning poverty and its consequences in how we live today. Produced by RainDogs Theatre Company) at the Theatre of Menilmontant, Paris.

2014 

The public installation homeless shelter : Van'Heart (An ephemeral installation day shelter for homeless people) accompanied the students of the College Marx Dormoy in Paris in creating a temporary refuge for the homeless.

2015   
In collaboration with the City Hall of Paris, a continuing research and work on creating and producing a highlyconnected new form of urban installation : UPP Urban ProjectParis.

2016–2017 
Currently working on Yesterday/Today/Tomorrow for the Venice Biennale 2017. This is a work visualises the European refugee crisis and gives voice to a people who don't have one. A singular voice for hundreds of thousands of people, from over 30 nationalities (speaking as many languages) in majority children, often illiterate. Each refugee creates 3 drawings, one of their life before (Yesterday), one of their current life (Today) and one of their imagined future (Tomorrow). Using these drawings as the conceptual base, this project is both an installation/performance and a social media voice. The South to the North, this work maps-out as a visual memory an exodus. From refugee boats at Hotspot camps on Greek islands to refugee centres in the UK. Hundreds and hundreds of refugees, in centres, camps, squats and shelters across Europe have participated in these drawings, creating their own contemporary culture and voice whilst simultaneously losing all traceability of their inherited culture. Traceability is credibility, without it, the existence of a people disappears. Each refugee drawing counts. Each refugee drawing is a voice. Every voice counts.

References

External links
Site web de Bryan McCormack
Blog de Bryan McCormack

Irish contemporary artists
1972 births
Living people
20th-century Irish painters
21st-century Irish painters
Irish male painters
Irish performance artists
20th-century Irish male artists